East Cheshire NHS Trust runs Congleton War Memorial Hospital, Knutsford and District Community Hospital and Macclesfield District General Hospital, in Cheshire, England. It provides both acute hospital services and community services has been rated 'Good' by the Care Quality Commission (CQC), with the most recent inspection outcome announced in 2019.

Macclesfield District General Hospital was purpose built in the early 1980s replacing a much older traditional infirmary. Congleton War Memorial Hospital opened in 1924, paid for by public subscription after years of fundraising by local people as a memorial to those who died in the first world war.

In April 2012 it made an unsuccessful bid to become an NHS Foundation Trust. 

The Casualty Department in Macclesfield has been under threat for some years, but in August 2013 it was said to be under no immediate threat.

The Trust had a contract with Arvato services for human resource services. 60 of the trust's staff were transferred to Arvato in 2013. In May 2016 Arvato said the contract was no longer commercially viable, demanding £2.4 million a year (more than double the contract price of £1.1 million a year) to continue after the end of the contractual period in April 2017. The contract is to be brought back in-house.

The Trust gained a contract for sexual health services when Cheshire West and Chester Council decided to transfer it from Countess of Chester Hospital NHS Foundation Trust in December 2014.

It spent £1.7 million on agency staff in 2014/5.  In February 2016 it was expecting a deficit of £18.3 million for the year 2015/6.

In July 2016 the board announced that it no longer believed the organisation is sustainable in its current form, forecasting a deficit in 2016/7 of £20m.

The sustainability and transformation plan for Merseyside and Cheshire proposed to downgrade the emergency department at Macclesfield District General Hospital to a minor injuries and illnesses unit, but within a fortnight, after widespread opposition it was altered to read "“The clear view is that the best model of care will include an A&E department at Macclesfield staffed by hospital doctors and clinicians.”

It is planning a joint electronic patient record system with Mid Cheshire Hospitals NHS Foundation Trust using Meditech's Expanse, which is cloud based and should operate from 2024.

See also

 List of hospitals in England
 List of NHS trusts

References

NHS hospital trusts
Health in Cheshire